Jeeralang is a locality in the Gippsland region of Victoria, Australia. At the 2006 census, Jeeralang and the surrounding area had a population of 589.

The locality was severely affected by the Black Saturday bushfires, including a fatality.

References

Towns in Victoria (Australia)
City of Latrobe